Pygopus robertsi, also known as Robert's scaly-foot or Cape York scaly-foot, is a species of legless lizard of the Pygopodidae family. It is endemic to Queensland, Australia.

Etymology
The specific name, robertsi, is in honor of Australian Charles George Roberts for assistance to scientists in the field.

References

Pygopus
Reptiles described in 2010
Endemic fauna of Australia
Pygopodids of Australia
Legless lizards
Taxa named by Patrick J. Couper